Dobrochov is a municipality and village in Prostějov District in the Olomouc Region of the Czech Republic. It has about 400 inhabitants.

Geography
It lies in an agricultural landscape in the Upper Morava Valley.

Transport
The D46 motorway passes through the municipality.

References

Villages in Prostějov District